Miss Universe Vietnam 2008, the 1st Miss Universe Vietnam pageant, was held on May 31, 2008, at the Vinpearl Land resort in Nha Trang, Khánh Hoà, Vietnam. 20 contestants competed for the crown. The first winner of the pageant was Nguyễn Thùy Lâm, the host delegate for the Miss Universe 2008 pageant held July 14, 2008, also in Nha Trang.  She made the Top 15.
As the winner, Nguyễn Thùy Lâm represents Vietnam at Miss Universe 2008. The two runners-up represent Vietnam at Miss World 2008 (Dương Trương Thiên Lý) and Miss Universe 2009 (Võ Hoàng Yến).

Results

Placements
Color keys

Special Awards

Contestants
20 contestants in the final.

References

Beauty pageants in Vietnam
2008 beauty pageants
Vietnamese awards